Hugo Filipe Ferreira dos Santos (born 27 January 1978) is a retired Portuguese footballer who played as a left winger.

Football career
Born in Alverca do Ribatejo, Vila Franca de Xira, Santos spent several seasons with hometown club F.C. Alverca, but appeared sparingly for the team, also being loaned twice to C.D. Olivais e Moscavide. He was part of one Primeira Liga roster whilst under contract, but after no matches in the competition he was released in 2003.

Santos then signed for G.D. Estoril-Praia, playing 27 scoreless games in his second season as the club suffered top level relegation. In January 2006 he left for S.C. Olhanense in Segunda Liga and, after a few months, was loaned to former team Moscavide also in that category, failing to make a competitive appearance and also being relegated.

In the summer of 2007, aged 29, Santos had his first abroad experience, joining FC Vihren Sandanski in Bulgaria. After suffering A Football Group relegation in his second year, he returned to his country and signed with yet another side in the Lisbon area, C.D. Mafra, retiring at the end of the campaign.

External links

1978 births
Living people
Portuguese footballers
Association football wingers
Primeira Liga players
Liga Portugal 2 players
Segunda Divisão players
F.C. Alverca players
C.D. Olivais e Moscavide players
G.D. Estoril Praia players
S.C. Olhanense players
C.D. Mafra players
First Professional Football League (Bulgaria) players
OFC Vihren Sandanski players
Portuguese expatriate footballers
Expatriate footballers in Bulgaria
Portuguese expatriate sportspeople in Bulgaria
People from Vila Franca de Xira
Sportspeople from Lisbon District